The 2020 Orlando City B season was the club's fourth season of existence and their second since returning from hiatus during the 2018 season. It was their second season as a founding member of USL League One, the third tier of the United States soccer pyramid, after moving from the second tier (USL Championship) in the restructuring. The team also moved from Montverde Academy where they spent the 2019 season, to the newly refurbished Osceola County Stadium at Orlando City's new training complex in Kissimmee, Florida.

On March 12 it was announced that the start of the 2020 USL League One season would be delayed as the league was temporarily suspended for 30 days on the advice of public health authorities due to the coronavirus pandemic. OCB's season eventually began on August 1, 127 days after originally scheduled. All home games were played behind closed doors.

It was the team's last season in USL League One, announcing on October 16 that it was withdrawing from USL1 at the end of the season in lieu of a new proposed MLS reserve league launching in 2021. On October 29, nine players were released as part of the end of season roster decisions, notably cutting a number of the older players in preparation for the shift in age group.

Roster

Competitions

Friendlies

USL League One 

 All times in regular season on Eastern Daylight Time (UTC-04:00) except where otherwise noted.

For the 2020 season, USL League One expanded by a net total of two teams following the addition of Union Omaha, New England Revolution II and Fort Lauderdale CF while Lansing Ignite folded after only one season. Canadian club Toronto FC II were later forced to withdraw for the season due to COVID-19 public health restrictions. A shortened 16-game regular season, reduced from 28, was announced on July 17, 2020. Only the top two teams in the regular season will advance to the postseason for a one-off 2020 USL League One Final to be played the weekend following the conclusion of the regular season.

Results summary

Results by round

Match results

Standings

U.S. Open Cup 

Due to their ownership by a more advanced level professional club (Orlando City SC), Orlando City B is ineligible for the Cup competition.

Squad statistics

Appearances

Goalscorers

Shutouts

Disciplinary record

Player movement

Transfers in

Loans in

Transfers out

Loans out

References 

Orlando City B
Orlando City B
Orlando City B seasons
Orlando City B